KIVY-LD is a low-power television station in Crockett, Texas, broadcasting locally on UHF channel 17 (virtual channel 16) as an affiliate of Antenna TV.

Digital television
The station's digital signal is multiplexed:

References

External links

Antenna TV affiliates
Television stations in Texas
Rewind TV affiliates
Television channels and stations established in 1994
Low-power television stations in the United States